Jolly Jumpers is a Dutch professional women's basketball team based in Tubbergen. The team plays in the  Women's Basketball League (WBL), the country's premier league. The club has won one national championship, in 2002.

History
The club was founded in 1969 by the gymnastics teacher Gé Westgeest. While the club started as a team for college students, the team played in the Eredivisie as soon as in 1975. In 2002, the Jumpers won their first national championship.

Honours
Women's Basketball League
Champions (1): 2001–02
Carla de Liefde Trophy
Winners (3): 2001, 2003, 2005
Promotiedivisie
Winners (1): 2016–17

References

External links
Official website (in Dutch)

Basketball teams established in 1969
Women's basketball teams in the Netherlands